The world's busiest airports by passenger traffic are measured by total passengers (data from Airports Council International), defined as passengers enplaned plus passengers deplaned plus direct-transit passengers. Hartsfield–Jackson Atlanta International Airport has held the top spot as the world's busiest airport each year since 1998, except for 2020, when it was temporarily unseated by Guangzhou Baiyun International Airport due to the effects of the COVID-19 pandemic. Hartsfield–Jackson Atlanta regained the top position in 2021. Alternatively, London has the world's busiest city airport system by passenger count. 

As of 2021, the United States accounts for the top five busiest airports in the world. Six countries have at least two airports in the top 50, with the United States at 20 and China at 13, Turkey with three; and Mexico, Russia, and South Korea with two airports each. In terms of regions, North America has 22 airports in the top 50, followed by East Asia at 16, Europe at seven, West Asia at three, and South Asia and South America each have one.

Graph for the first 10

Preliminary 2022 statistics

2021 statistics
Source: 2021 report from the Port Authority of New York and New Jersey

2020 statistics
Source: 2020 report from the Port Authority of New York and New Jersey.

2019 statistics
Figures as reported by airports are as follows:

2018 statistics 
Figures as reported by airports are as follows:

2017 statistics 
Airports Council International's full-year figures are as follows:

2016 statistics 
Airports Council International's full-year figures are as follows:

2010–2015

2000–2009

See also
 List of the busiest airports
 List of busiest airports by international passenger traffic
 List of busiest airports by aircraft movements
 Busiest airports by continent

References

External links
Airports Council International Statistics and Data Centre
Aviation database with passenger traffic of over 1900 airports

 Passenger traffic